Eduard Petrov (born 13 March 1963) is a Soviet swimmer. He competed in the men's 1500 metre freestyle at the 1980 Summer Olympics.

References

1963 births
Living people
Soviet male freestyle swimmers
Olympic swimmers of the Soviet Union
Swimmers at the 1980 Summer Olympics
Place of birth missing (living people)